Kitchen Criminals is a BBC television series in which top chefs John Burton Race and Angela Hartnett are given the task of travelling the length and breadth of the UK, looking for Britain's worst cooks.  After selecting the 20 worst, the amateur cooks must undertake a series of cookery challenges until only one contestant from each team is left.  The 2 remaining contestants must then cook a meal for 3 top food critics.

External links
 

BBC Television shows
British cooking television shows
2007 British television series debuts
2007 British television series endings
Television series by All3Media
Television series by Optomen